The Forest City Owls are a baseball team in the Coastal Plain League, a collegiate summer baseball league. The team played its inaugural 2008 season in Forest City, North Carolina after the same franchise (previously known as the Stingers), owned by Ken Silver, moved from Spartanburg, South Carolina in the offseason. The Owls play their home games at McNair Field, a new baseball stadium constructed near downtown Forest City by the municipal government utilizing town funds, private contributions, and more than $1 million in donations from Robert C. McNair, a Forest City native and owner of the NFL Houston Texans. The Owls won their home (and season) debut on Thursday, May 29, 2008, by a score of 4–2 over the Gastonia Grizzlies before 2,675 fans. McNair threw out the first pitch, and the Owls turned an ever-rare triple play in the top of the 6th inning.

In the 2009 season, the Owls won the Petitt Cup, the Coastal Plain League title, after going 51–9 in 60 games during the regular season and postseason. Forest City's 22–2 start, 24 first-half victories, 25 wins at home, and 46 regular-season wins all were CPL records. The Owls were also voted as the No. 1 collegiate summer team in the country, courtesy of pgcrosschecker.com.

On January 27, 2011 it was announced that the Owls had been selected by USA Baseball to host Team Japan on July 1, 2011.

In the 2011 season, the Owls went back to the CPL playoffs to defend their back-to-back titles. The Owls fell in the second round to the Gastonia Grizzlies. The 2011 season was highlighted by the July 1, 2011 game of Team Japan vs. the Forest City Owls. Over 3,700 fans attended the game and witnessed the first-ever international game to be played at McNair Field. The Owls fell 8–1 to Team Japan but came back to have a 30–25 overall record for 2011. Over 64,400 fans walked through the gates at McNair Field that season. 

In September 2015, Mr. Silver sold The Owls to Phil Dangel from Knoxville, Tennessee.
In 2017, The Owls led The CPL with the most victories for the entire season, winning both the first and second half. They also were recognized by the All-Star committee by having 5 all-stars as well as the coach, Matt Reed, was selected to coach The Western Division All-Stars.

Major League alumni 

The Owls boast four alumnus in Major League Baseball. Both lefty pitcher Josh Edgin and right-handed reliever Heath Hembree played for Forest City in 2008 and 2009. Edgin got drafted by the New York Mets where he is still a member of the organization. Hembree initially signed with the San Francisco Giants and now plays for the Boston Red Sox.

Infielder Vince Belnome joined the team for the 2009 championship season. Belnome now plays 1st base in the Tampa Bay Rays organization.

Righty pitcher Spencer Patton played in Spartanburg in 2007 and made the jump to Forest City when the team moved in 2008. Patton made his Major League debut on September 4, 2014 and now pitches for the Texas Rangers. Patton also played with the Owls in 2009, where we finished with a 9-0 record and 1.46 ERA.

Season by season results

References

External links
 Official Site
 Coastal Plain League
 N.C. baseball team racks up wins and shatters records - video segment of 2009 season; Tarheel Traveler, WRAL-TV.

Coastal Plain League
2008 establishments in North Carolina
Baseball teams established in 2008
Amateur baseball teams in North Carolina
Forest City, North Carolina